The Liublinskaya mine is a large mine located in the south of Russia in Novosibirsk Oblast. Liublinskaya represents the largest bentonite reserve in Russia having estimated reserves of 20.4 million tonnes.

References 

Bentonite mines in Russia